1746 Brouwer is a Hilda asteroid from the outermost region of the asteroid belt, approximately 64 kilometers in diameter. It was discovered on 14 September 1963, by IU's Indiana Asteroid Program at Goethe Link Observatory near Brooklyn, Indiana, United States. It was named after astronomer Dirk Brouwer.

Classification and orbit 

Brouwer is a member of the Hilda family, a large group that orbits in resonance with the gas giant Jupiter and are thought to originate from the Kuiper belt. Brouwer orbits the Sun at a distance of 3.1–4.8 AU once every 7 years and 10 months (2,865 days). Its orbit has an eccentricity of 0.21 and an inclination of 8° with respect to the ecliptic.

Physical characteristics 

In the Tholen classification, Brouwer is characterized as a dark and reddish D-type asteroid.

Rotation period 

Several rotational lightcurves of Brouwer gave a rotation period between 19.72 and 19.88 hours with a brightness variation of 0.21 and 0.35 magnitude.

Diameter and albedo 

According to the surveys carried out by the Infrared Astronomical Satellite IRAS, the Japanese Akari satellite, and NASA's Wide-field Infrared Survey Explorer with its subsequent NEOWISE mission, Brouwer measures between 61.50 and 64.25 kilometers in diameter, and its surface has an albedo between 0.045 and 0.051.

The Collaborative Asteroid Lightcurve Link agrees with IRAS, that is an albedo of 0.045 and a diameter of 64.25 kilometers with an absolute magnitude of 9.95.

Naming 

This minor planet was named in honor of Dutch–American astronomer Dirk Brouwer (1902–1966). Originally at Leiden University and specialized in celestial mechanics, he became director of the Yale University Observatory and was the president of IAU's commission 20, Positions & Motions of Minor Planets, Comets & Satellites, from 1948 to 1955. The official  was published by the Minor Planet Center on 15 July 1968.

Notes

References

External links 
 Asteroid Lightcurve Database (LCDB), query form (info )
 Dictionary of Minor Planet Names, Google books
 Asteroids and comets rotation curves, CdR – Observatoire de Genève, Raoul Behrend
 Discovery Circumstances: Numbered Minor Planets (1)-(5000) – Minor Planet Center
 
 

001740
001746
Named minor planets
001746
19630914